Kasper Averink (born 11 June 1993) is a Dutch basketball player.

External links
Eurobasket.com Profile

1993 births
Living people
BC Prievidza players
Dutch Basketball League players
Dutch men's basketball players
BSW (basketball club) players
Shooting guards
Sportspeople from Leiden
B.S. Leiden players